Murray George Webb (born 22 June 1947 in Invercargill) is a prominent New Zealand caricature artist and a former New Zealand Test cricketer.

Cricket career
Six feet four inches tall, Murray Webb was a fast bowler who played first-class cricket for Otago between 1969-70 and 1973-74 and represented New Zealand in three Test matches. He was one of the fastest bowlers ever to play in New Zealand domestic cricket.

In his first first-class match, against Wellington, he took 5 for 34 and 3 for 43, and he finished his first season with 31 wickets at an average of 17.25, helping Otago to win the Plunket Shield. He played one match for New Zealand against the visiting Australian team, and Wisden noted the emergence of "a most promising fast bowler". In 1970-71, he took 6 for 56 for South Island against North Island in a trial match before the two-match series against England, and made his Test debut in the Second Test, taking two wickets. 

His bowling helped Otago to another Plunket Shield in 1971-72, when he took his best first-class figures of 7 for 49 against Wellington. He toured the West Indies with New Zealand at the end of the season, but took only eight wickets in six matches, and none in the one Test he played.

After missing the 1972-73 season except for one match for Canterbury he returned to Otago in 1973-74 and took 40 wickets in five matches in the Plunket Shield at 14.65. He took five or more wickets in an innings five times, with best figures of 6 for 49 against Auckland. He was selected for the First Test against Australia, but took only two wickets in a drawn match on a batsmen's pitch. It was his last first-class match, at the age of 26.

His younger brother Richard was also a pace bowler who played for Otago; Richard also represented New Zealand, but as a one-day player.

Artistic career
After a brief stint as a teacher in Dunedin, Murray Webb has been a prolific caricaturist since the 1970s. His subjects include politicians, sports people, and other people in the public eye, both in New Zealand and abroad. As well as contemporary figures he also draws people from the past, including six portraits of Katherine Mansfield. 

The Alexander Turnbull Library, National Library of New Zealand, holds more than 800 items by him in its collection, most of them single digital portraits.

The Auckland psychology academic Barry Hughes has written: "Why do Murray Webb's caricatures of public figures look, paradoxically, more truthful than their photographs?"

He provided the illustrations to the book 100 Great Rugby Characters by Joseph Romanos and Grant Harding (Rugby Press, Auckland, 1991). His regular spot in the editorial pages of the Otago Daily Times was called "Webbsight". He now concentrates on private commissions.

Personal life
Webb has two sisters and a brother, Richard. He was a passenger on the Wahine when it sank in Wellington Harbour in 1968. He helped save a toddler by gently tossing the child from the sinking ship to its mother in a lifeboat.

A graduate of the University of Otago where he studied geography, Webb lives in Dunedin. He has been married twice and has three sons and a daughter.

See also
 List of Otago representative cricketers

References

External links
 Cartoonists Inc. Documentary
 Murray Webb items at the National Library of New Zealand
 Murray Webb at Cricket Archive
 Murray Webb at Cricinfo

1947 births
Living people
Canterbury cricketers
New Zealand Test cricketers
New Zealand caricaturists
New Zealand cartoonists
New Zealand cricketers
Otago cricketers
University of Otago alumni
South Island cricketers